The al-Abbas missile was an Iraqi Short-range, Surface-to-surface Ballistic missile that was a longer range version of the al-Hussein missile designed to reach most of the Middle East including the Strait of Hormuz. It too was a Scud missile derivative.

History
The Scud missiles obtained by Iraq during the Iran-Iraq War did not prove helpful as the range of the missiles were only  and could not reach the Iranian capital Tehran. The Iraqis would then develop the Al-Hussein missile and later on make the al-Abbas missile which would have an even longer range. The Iraqis however did not use it later on due to poor missile guidance and flight instability. It is still unknown whether this missile reached operational status and was stockpiled or not.

Characteristics
The missile was said to be unstable because it would tumble about its centre of gravity on reentry, it also had poor guidance.

See also
 al-Hussein (missile)
 Al-Samoud 2
 Badr-2000

References 

Scud missiles
Military history of Iraq
Short-range ballistic missiles of Iraq
Ballistic missiles of Iraq
Surface-to-surface missiles of Iraq
Weapons and ammunition introduced in 1988
Theatre ballistic missiles